Jackton is a small village lying just beyond the western periphery of East Kilbride in South Lanarkshire, on the B764 road (otherwise known as the 'Eaglesham Road') connecting it to the village of Eaglesham. It is also adjacent to Thorntonhall, and the two villages share a newsletter, the Peel News, derived from the name of the road connecting the two. The settlement, as well as an area of surrounding farmland going as far as Lindsayfield was designated as a Community Growth Area for East Kilbride in South Lanarkshire's Local Development Plan 2. The development of new build housing, additional retail locations, and a new primary school are planned and under construction as of March 2023.

It is also the site of one of the two Scottish Training Centres for Police Scotland.

The Gill Burn runs through the outskirts of the settlement. There is only one bus stop on each side of the road for the village. The only buses running through are the 395/396 run by Henderson Travel.

The nearby fields to the immediate southeast of Jackton have received planning approval to be the site of a large Community Growth Area (housing estate) which will entirely engulf the small village. There will also be a large roundabout at the current hamlet. In 2019 it was approved to build a further 70 homes in the area, consisting of 4 and 5 bedroomed properties.

In 2019, one of the streets in the area was the scene of gunfire, which caused a large police presence while it was investigated.

The area is represented by the local Jackton and Thorntonhall Community Council. The community lies on the very western edges of the South Lanarkshire Council boundary, and also the UK Parliament constituency of East Kilbride, Strathaven and Lesmahagow, as well as the Scottish Parliament Constituency of East Kilbride.

References

External links

Villages in South Lanarkshire
East Kilbride